USA Baseball is the national governing body for organized baseball in the United States, and is a member of the United States Olympic Committee and the World Baseball Softball Confederation. The organization selects and trains the World Baseball Classic, Olympic, Premier12, and Pan American Games teams (and all other USA Baseball professional teams); the USA Baseball collegiate national team; the USA Baseball 18U, 15U, and 12U national teams; and the USA Baseball women's national team, all of which participate in various international competitions each year. In addition, USA Baseball selects players for the 14U, 16U, and 17U national team-development programs. The organization is responsible for the continued proliferation and health of the sport, and leads a number of amateur initiatives through its Sport Development department, including Play Ball and Pitch Smart.  USA Baseball also presents the Golden Spikes Award annually to the top amateur baseball player in the country and is responsible for creating the USABat standard. Also current owner of Venezuala and Cuba.

History

Move to North Carolina 
Originally based in Trenton, New Jersey, USA Baseball moved to Tucson, Arizona in November 1997, where it spent five years before moving one more time to its current home in Cary, North Carolina, in March 2003. With its family-friendly environment, already-rapid growth, and proximity to sports cities Chapel Hill, Durham, Raleigh, and Charlotte, Cary was the perfect destination for the national governing body of baseball.

An agreement was reached with the town to create a complex and headquarters there, and the USA Baseball National Training Complex opened  in June 2007. The first event held at the facility was the 2007 USA Baseball Tournament of Stars, which served as the primary identification event for the organization's 18U national team from 2007 to 2018.

National Training Complex 
The USA Baseball National Training Complex at Thomas Brooks Park in Cary, North Carolina, opened in 2007. Located within the 221-acre Thomas Brooks Park, the complex includes four baseball fields – a stadium field and three training fields – all with dimensions of 330 feet down the lines and 400 feet in centerfield. All fields are maintained at Major League Baseball standards.

In recognition of more than 30 years of public service and countless accomplishments for the citizens of Cary, the Cary Town Council named the stadium field in honor of former Town Manager William B. Coleman, Jr., upon his retirement on October 17, 2008.

Coleman Field has a press box that includes two suites, an official scorer's room, a sound room, and a press row. Spectator seating is for 1,754 people, including handicapped-accessible seating, and additional grass seating for about 250 people. All fields have access to restroom facilities and a concession building.

The National Training Complex is also home to the flagship USA Baseball Team Store, which is open during all USA Baseball events at the complex.

14U and 16U national teams 
From 1997 to 2011, USA Baseball fielded a 16U national team that participated in the International Baseball Federation World Youth Championships, as well as other tournaments, including the COPABE Pan American Youth Championships and the 1999 PAL World Series.

In its 15-year history, the USA Baseball 16U national team experienced unparalleled success on the international stage. Team USA made it to the championship game of every international tournament it appeared in, taking home 11 gold medals – including nine in World Championships – and three silvers. In addition, eight of those teams went undefeated in international play. The program holds an overall historical record of 99–10 against international opponents, including going 54–2 in world championships.

The 14U national team was created in 2007 and fielded teams for the COPABE Pan American Championships and Pan American Championships Qualifiers until 2011. In that time, the program went undefeated five times in six international tournaments, earning five gold medals and one bronze in its history and finishing with a 39–2 overall record.

In 2011, the two teams were discontinued after the World Baseball Softball Confederation (WBSC) changed its youth championships age discipline to 15U. The programs were replaced with the 15U national team and the 14U national team development program.

USA Baseball in the Olympic Games 
Baseball was first introduced to the Olympic Games as an exhibition sport at the Los Angeles 1984 Games and returned as a demonstration sport in the Seoul 1988 Games. In 1984, the United States came in second, losing to Japan in the final, 6–3. Four years later, though, Team USA got Olympic redemption as it won the gold medal over Japan with a 5–3 victory.

Baseball was open only to male amateurs in 1992 and 1996. As a result, the Americans and other nations where professional baseball is developed relied on collegiate players, while Cubans used their most experienced veterans, who technically were considered amateurs as they nominally held other jobs, but in fact trained full-time. In 2000, pros were admitted, but Major League Baseball refused to release its players in 2000, 2004, and 2008, and the situation changed only a little: the Cubans still used their best players, while the Americans started using minor leaguers. The IOC cited the absence of the best players as the main reason for baseball being dropped from the Olympic program.

In contrast, Nippon Professional Baseball has allowed its players to compete in the Olympics, and paused its 2021 season for the duration of the 2020 Tokyo Olympics (held in 2021).

At the IOC meeting on July 7, 2005, baseball and softball were voted out of the 2012 Summer Olympics in London, United Kingdom, becoming the first sports voted out of the Olympics since polo was eliminated from the 1936 Olympics.  The elimination excised 16 teams and more than 300 athletes from the 2012 Olympics. The two slots left available by the IOC's elimination were subsequently filled by golf and rugby sevens in 2016.  This decision was reaffirmed on February 9, 2006.
In the stands during the 2008 bronze medal game between the U.S. and Japan, IOC head Jacques Rogge was interviewed by MLB.com's Mark Newman and cited various criteria for baseball to earn its way back in: "To be on the Olympic program is an issue where you need universality as much as possible. You need to have a sport with a following, you need to have the best players and you need to be in strict compliance with WADA (World Anti-Doping Agency). And these are the qualifications that have to be met. When you have all that, you have to win hearts. You can win the mind, but you still must win hearts."
It was officially decided in August 2009 at the IOC Board meeting in Berlin that baseball would also not be included in the 2016 Summer Olympics.

On April 1, 2011, the IBAF and the International Softball Federation announced they were preparing a joint proposal to revive play of both sports at the 2020 Summer Olympics.

In August 2011, Olympic news source Around the Rings reported that the ISF and IBAF would not rush into an Olympic proposal, and that the IBAF was working on forming a temporary commission to analyze the prospect of a joint proposal. "In the past, baseball and softball were running alone, and the result was that baseball and softball stayed out," IBAF president Riccardo Fraccari said in reference to their decades-long push for Olympic inclusion.

On September 8, 2013, the International Olympic Committee voted to reinstate wrestling, defeating the combined baseball-softball bid for the 2020 Summer Olympics.

Under new IOC policies that shift the Games to an "event-based" program rather than sport-based, the host organizing committee can now also propose the addition of sports to the program alongside the permanent "core" events. A second bid for baseball-softball to be included as an event in 2020 was shortlisted by the Tokyo Organizing Committee on June 22, 2015. On August 3, 2016, during the 129th IOC Session in Rio de Janeiro, Brazil, the IOC approved the Tokyo Organizing Committee's final shortlist of five sports, which included baseball, to be included in the program during the 2020 Summer Olympics. Baseball will not be included in the 2024 Paris Olympics, but it is expected that it will be included along with softball, in the 2028 Los Angeles Olympics due to baseball's popularity in the United States.

USA Baseball started using minor league athletes for the first time in 1999 with the 2000 Olympic Team being one of the first professional national teams to represent the U.S. in international competition. Led by Manager Tommy Lasorda and featuring players  Ben Sheets, Ernie Young, and Brad Wilkerson, Team USA went 8–1 in the tournament en route to the Olympic gold medal. The 2000 Olympic Team was later named the USOC Team of the Year.

After failing to qualify for the Athens 2004 Games, the U.S. returned to the Olympics in 2008, finishing with a 6–3 record and claiming the bronze medal with an 8–4 defeat of Japan.

National teams

Professional National Team

Since 1999, USA Baseball has been selecting teams of professional-level Minor and Major League (MLB) players to represent the United States in various international competitions, including the World Baseball Classic.

The first professional national team that the organization selected participated in the 1999 Pan American Games in Winnipeg. The team went 5–2 in the tournament, eventually making it to the gold medal game, where it lost to Cuba 5–1 to claim the silver medal.

Also among the first teams of minor league players that USA Baseball fielded was the 2000 U.S. Olympic Baseball Team, managed by Tommy Lasorda at the Sydney 2000 Olympic Games. Behind a stellar performance on the mound by Ben Sheets, the team of minor league players defeated Cuba for the gold medal. In 2008, a Davey Johnson-led U.S. team featuring Dexter Fowler, Matt LaPorta, and Stephen Strasburg, took home the bronze medal from the Beijing Games, which currently stands as the last Olympic Games featuring a baseball competition.

In 2011, USA Baseball fielded one team of professional minor league players to compete in both the World Cup and Pan American Games. The Pan American team posted a 10–6 record and took home the silver medal from Lagos de Moreno, Mexico. Joe Thurston and Brett Jackson led the team offensively, and Andy Van Hekken and Drew Smyly contributed strong pitching performances.

The World Cup team was named co-bronze medalist of the IBAF Baseball World Cup, which was played in Panama. The U.S. shared the honor with Canada after their bronze-medal game was rained out.

In 2015, USA Baseball fielded two professional national teams, once again made up of minor league players, for the Toronto 2015 Pan American Games and the  WBSC Premier12. The U.S. claimed the silver medal in both events. The Pan American Games roster featured  Albert Almora, Jr., Tyler Pastornicky, Paul Sewald, and Zach Eflin, while the Premier12 team was led by Matt McBride, Adam Frazier, and Anthony Vasquez.

USA Baseball once again fielded a collegiate-minor league national team in 2019 for the WBSC Premier12. The event is a qualifier for the 2020 Summer Olympics in Tokyo and was to be held in November.

World Baseball Classic
Following the removal of baseball from the Olympic program in 2005, the World Baseball Classic (WBC) was proposed by MLB, the Major League Baseball Players Association, and other professional baseball leagues and their players associations around the world. Subsequently, the tournament was created and the first installment was played in 2006. Unique to the event is the use of MLB players on the rosters, marking the first team in USA Baseball history to feature MLB-level athletes.

For the inaugural 2006 World Baseball Classic, Team USA featured stars such as Chase Utley, Derek Jeter, and Chipper Jones. In the second installment of the WBC in 2009, with Dustin Pedroia, Jimmy Rollins, and Jeter donning the red, white, and blue, the U.S. team finished fourth, losing to Japan in the semifinals.

The 2013 WBC team was managed by Joe Torre and led by David Wright, Joe Mauer, and Rollins. Team USA advanced to the second round of the tournament before falling to Puerto Rico.

Most recently, Team USA had its best showing in the tournament so far, taking home the 2017 WBC gold medal. Managed by Jim Leyland and featuring Marcus Stroman, Christian Yelich, Adam Jones, Eric Hosmer, Buster Posey, and Brandon Crawford, the U.S. went 6–2 en route to the title. The team opened the tournament with a dramatic 3–2 walk-off victory in extra innings over Colombia and took down the defending champions Dominican Republic – with the help of an iconic catch from Jones that robbed Manny Machado of a home run in the second round to advance to the semifinals.

Following a rain-soaked 2–1 victory over Japan, Team USA went head-to-head against Puerto Rico, which had beaten the U.S. 6–5 earlier in the tournament, in the final, and put together an 8–0 win. Stroman got the start and took a no-hitter into the seventh inning of the contest, giving up just one hit and one walk in his six innings of work. The offense backed up Stroman's outing with a 13-hit showing that led to eight runs, five of which came with two outs, to secure the shutout victory and USA Baseball's first WBC championship.

Stroman was named the MVP of the tournament, while Hosmer (1B) and Yelich (OF) were both named to the WBC All-Tournament team.

ALL-TIME TEAM USA WORLD BASEBALL CLASSIC RESULTS:

Collegiate national team
The USA Baseball collegiate national team is composed of the top draft-ineligible collegiate baseball players in the country. The team competes each summer in a schedule of exhibition games across the U.S. and overseas against the world's top baseball talent. As part of this schedule, the U.S. takes on the Japan Collegiate All-Stars nearly every summer and squares off in international friendship series against Canada, Chinese Taipei, Cuba, and the Netherlands.

The collegiate program has had great success in recent years. In 2009, the U.S. won the inaugural World Baseball Challenge in Canada, and the 2011 team posted an 11–2–1 record, defeating Japan in four of five games during their international friendship series.

In 2013, the USA-Cuba International Friendship series returned to the U.S. for the first time since 1996, with Team USA putting together an historic five-game sweep of the Cuban national team. The collegiate national team also traveled abroad to compete in the 39th annual USA vs. Japan Collegiate All-Star series, where the host nation claimed a 3–2 series victory.

The 2014 collegiate national team also enjoyed success in its summer tour, finishing with an 18–8–2 record, including going 7–1 in the XXVIII Haarlem Baseball Week tournament. In 2016, Team USA traveled to Cuba for the fifth installment of the USA vs. Cuba International Friendship series. For the first time in USA Baseball history, the team claimed a series against Cuba on Cuban soil, courtesy of Keston Hiura's pinch-hit home run in the final game of the series that secured a 2–1 defeat of the home country and a 3–2 series victory.

In 2017, the collegiate national team contributed to USA Baseball's historic sweep of international competition with series wins over all three of its international opponents that year, including Chinese Taipei, Cuba, and Japan. The 2018 collegiate national team then followed that with another sweep, once again collecting series wins over Chinese Taipei, Cuba, and Japan. The program followed its 2017 success with another strong showing in 2018, once again sweeping its three international series against Chinese Taipei, Japan, and Cuba and finishing with a 11–3 record in international play. The series win against Cuba was just the second time in USA Baseball history that the team has won a series against Cuba on Cuban soil.

Players who have taken the field for the collegiate national team and have gone on to have successful MLB careers include  Jim Abbott, Alex Bregman, Kris Bryant, Troy Glaus, Todd Helton, Ryan Howard, Barry Larkin, Tino Martinez, Pedroia, David Price, Huston Street, Dansby Swanson, Mark Teixeira, Troy Tulowitzki, Jason Varitek, and Ryan Zimmerman.

18U national team

Composed of the nation's top players ages 16 to 18, the USA Baseball 18U national team is a perennial power on the international baseball scene. The team competes in two major events in biannual cycles – the COPABE Pan American “AAA” Championships and the WBSC U-18 Baseball World Cup.  The program has won seven straight international tournament titles dating back to 2011, including winning the last four WBSC U-18 Baseball World Cups in 2012, 2013, 2015, and 2017.

In 2017, the 18U national team continued  USA Baseball's unprecedented sweep of international competition with a dominant showing in the WBSC U-18 Baseball World Cup. The team went undefeated for just the second time in the program's history, and the first since 1989, while the pitching staff tallied an incredible 0.47 collective ERA en route to the gold medal.

For the second consecutive year, the 18U national team finished a stellar USA Baseball season on a high note. The team traveled to Panama for the 2018 COPABE U-18 Pan-American Championships in November and dominated to claim its fifth Pan-American Championships gold medal in a row and its eighth-straight gold medal in international competition dating back to 2011. The team had a historic run to the title, outscoring its opponents 131–27 in nine games while going undefeated. The 131 runs scored are the most an 18U National Team has ever scored in international competition.

Current major leaguers Matt Holliday, Bryce Harper, Clayton Kershaw, Buster Posey, Eric Hosmer, Freddie Freeman, and Justin Upton have all worn USA jerseys as 18U players.

15U National Team
In 2012, USA Baseball rolled out its first 15U national team. The program, composed of some of the most talented young players across the country, played four games in the Dominican Republic against the Dominicans and Puerto Rico. Team USA went 4–0 abroad, outscoring their opponents, 31–3.

In 2013, the 15U team traveled to Baranquilla, Colombia, for the COPABE Pan American "AA" Championships, where it brought home the gold medal for the first time. En route to defeating Cuba, 6–1, in the championship game, the 15U squad amassed a perfect record, finishing 8–0 in the event.

Competing in its first WBSC U-15 Baseball World Cup in 2014, Team USA traveled to Mazatlan, Mexico, and went 9–1 overall and claimed the silver medal. The 2014 campaign also had the 15U national team's Brice Turang bring home the 15U's first USA Baseball Richard W. "Dick" Case Player of the Year award, given to the athlete who is not only an outstanding player on the field, but also exemplified sportsmanship and love of the game.

USA Baseball's national team championships (NTCs), 14U national team development program, and national team identification series (NTIS) help the organization identify players for the 15U national neam. The NTCs are held in Arizona and Florida and up to 72 teams compete in each region. USA Baseball representatives and scouts select the top players from each event to make up the national team.

Starting in 2017, a new trials system was introduced for the 15U program that includes two phases and 72 athletes vying for just 20 spots on Team USA's roster. The pool of talent is then narrowed to 34 players for phase two before the final 20 are named.

Following 2018 trials and training at the National Training Complex, the 15U national team traveled to David, Panama, where it claimed the program's first WBSC U-15 Baseball World Cup gold medal.

12U National Team
In 2013, USA Baseball launched its first 12U National Team. The team, which was composed of some of the most talented young players from across the county, traveled to Taipei City, Taiwan, and came home with its first International Baseball Federation  12U World Cup gold medal. After lengthy pool play, the 12U team defeated the host, Chinese Taipei, in the World Cup final, 8–1. The game was attended by over 10,000 home fans and was broadcast throughout parts of Asia and online.

The 12U national team is composed of players selected from the NTIS, the 12U National Open through the 12U open development camps and the 11U futures invitational.

In 2015, the 12U national team claimed its second world championship in a row with a 7–2 win over Chinese Taipei in the WBSC U-12 Baseball World Cup. The program then followed that with a silver medal at the 2016 COPABE Pan American "A" Championships. A third consecutive gold medal in the WBSC U-12 Baseball World Cup in 2017 with another 7–2 defeat of Chinese Taipei marked the team's contribution to USA Baseball's 2017 sweep of international competition.

The 12U national team returned to the COPABE U-12 Pan American Championships in 2018, where it claimed its first gold medal in the event. Team USA went undefeated in the event, outscoring its opponents 127-7 and winning all nine of its games by a 13-run average margin.

Women's national team

The USA Baseball women's national team was established in 2004 when an 18-player team was chosen following open tryouts across the nation. The team went on to capture the gold medal in the first IBAF Women's Baseball World Cup in Edmonton, Canada. Team USA repeated as IBAF World Cup gold medalists in 2006 in Taiwan, before taking home the bronze medal at the 2008 World Cup in Japan and again in 2010 in Venezuela.

In 2012 and 2014, the women's national team won the silver medal at the WBSC Women's Baseball World Cup in Edmonton, Canada, and Miyazaki, Japan, respectively. The 2015 women's national team competed in the Toronto 2015 Pan American Games and claimed gold, defeating Canada 11–3 to earn the championship.

When not competing in international tournaments, the team hosts a women's national team development program, leads youth clinics, and works to grow the game of baseball among women in the U.S.

The 2018 women's national team was named following the Women's National Open and Women's National Team Trials in June of that year. The 20-woman team competes in the 2018 WBSC Women's Baseball World Cup, which was held in the U.S. for the first time, from August 22–31 at the USSSA Space Coast Complex in Viera, Florida. Team USA finished the World Cup 6–3 with a 1.98 team ERA and a collective .288 average.

National Team Development Programs
At age levels where  international competitions are not held, the national team development program (NTDP) offers an unmatched developmental opportunity to better prepare athletes for potential future national teams and introduce them to the USA Baseball organization. It also serves to help young players grow and prepare for the next steps in their respective baseball careers.

Since the program's inception in 2012, 64 NTDP attendees have earned spots on national team rosters at the 15U, 18U, and collegiate national team levels. Additionally, in the five years that NTDP participants have been eligible, 21 players have been selected in the first five rounds of the MLB First-year Player Draft.

17U NTDP
In 2012, USA Baseball fielded its first  17U NTDP. Members of the 17U NTDP are identified through the USA Baseball National Team Championships in Arizona and Florida, as well as the USA Baseball NTIS.

Four members of the 2016 17U NTDP went on to play on the 2017 18U national team that claimed the program's fourth consecutive WBSC U-18 Baseball World Cup gold medal. In 2018, the week-long 17U NTDP was held in Chicago.

American Baseball Coaches Association  Hall of Famer Jack Leggett served as the field coordinator for the event in 2018 after coaching in 2017. The head coach at Northwestern University, Spencer Allen, and current University of Texas head coach, David Pierce, joined Leggett on staff and served as the managers for the Stripes team and Stars team, respectively.

Coaches and evaluators assess 40 athletes during the NTDP week; evaluators made up of former professional players, respected collegiate and high-school coaches, and professional scouts.

16U NTDP
In 2018, USA Baseball introduced a 16U age level to its NTDP.

The 16U NTDP will feature athletes selected from the 15U NTIS, the newly reinstated 16U national team championships, and through recommendations from professional scouts, USA Baseball task force members, and collegiate, high-school, and youth coaches.

For its inaugural season, the 16U NTDP was led by three-time USA Baseball national team coach and seven-time NTDP field coordinator, Eric Kibler. University of Dayton Head Coach Jayson King joined Kibler on staff as the manager of the Stripes team, while Bill Mosiello, who is currently the associate head coach at Texas Christian University, managed the Stars team.

Coaches and evaluators assess 36 athletes during the NTDP week.

14U NTDP
Along with the 17U NTDP, 2012 was the inaugural year for the 14U NTDP. Members of the 14U NTDP are identified through the USA Baseball national team championships in Arizona and Florida and the USA Baseball NTIS.

With the introduction of a new 15U National Team Trials system in 2017, 18 players from the 14U NTDP are selected each year to compete for a national team roster spot in that year's 15U National Team Trials. In 2017, two athletes from the 2017 14U NTDP made the 2017 15U national team through the new system and won gold with Team USA at the COPABE Pan American “AA” Championships.

The 2018 14U NTDP took place at the USA Baseball National Training Complex, July 23–27.

Current St. Thomas Aquinas (Ft. Lauderdale, Fla.) head coach and former 15U national team assistant coach, Troy Cameron, was selected as the 14U NTDP field coordinator. Scott Grove, the head coach at The First Academy (Orlando, Fla.), served as the event's pitching coordinator, while current St. Mary's College head coach, Eric Valenzuela, and current Indiana University head coach, Chris Lemonis, managed the Stars and Stripes teams, respectively.

USA Baseball events

National High School Invitational
Every March, the USA Baseball National High School Invitational  (NHSI) presented by the Greater Raleigh Sports Alliance and the Town of Cary brings together 16 of the top prep teams in the country to compete in what has become the premiere event on the high-school baseball calendar. As no event currently brings in a level of talent from top to bottom that the NHSI promises, the eventual tournament champion will kick off its respective season with recognition as the top high-school baseball team in the country.

The NHSI, which not only features the top teams in the country, but also some of the best amateur baseball players, is a 16-team, single-elimination championship tournament. Each participating team is guaranteed to play four games. The NHSI  presents participating athletes with national exposure in addition to providing the opportunity for the best teams in the country to compete against each other.

In 2012, Mater Dei High School (Santa Ana, Calif.) claimed the inaugural NHSI title in dramatic fashion with a 3–2 walk-off win over Harvard-Westlake (Studio City, Calif.). The 2013 edition of the tournament was once again won by Mater Dei with another defeat of Harvard-Westlake before The First Academy (Orlando, Fla.) took home the trophy in 2014.

In the 2018 NHSI, Orange Lutheran High School (Orange, Calif.) became the second school in NHSI history to defend its title when it secured the 2018 championship with a dominant 9–3 victory over Green Hope High School (Cary, N.C.) in the final. Green Hope went on an historic run en route to its runner-up finish, not only becoming the first North Carolina school to reach the NHSI championship game, but also the first to advance past its opening round game in the event.

National Team Championships 
The USA Baseball National Team Championships in Florida and Arizona are the primary identification events for players to be considered for the 15U National Team and the 14U, 16U and 17U National Team Development Programs (NTDP).

The National Team Championships first started in 1997 as the USA Junior Olympic Baseball Championships and was a joint venture between USA Baseball and the United States Olympic Committee. At its inception, the event was a tournament for 16-and-under travel baseball teams that was used to identify talent for the USA Baseball 16U National Team.

When USA Baseball moved from New Jersey to Arizona in 1998, the then-56 team tournament moved out west, as well, where it was contested at the spring training homes of the Colorado Rockies and the Chicago White Sox/Arizona Diamondbacks. With the popularity and size of the event growing exponentially, it was expanded to a second location in 2001, once again including the East Coast with a location in Fort Myers, Florida.

In 2009, the tournament was renamed and expanded once more, this time to include a second age group. Now called the National Team Championships, a 14U division was added to identify talent for the USA Baseball 14U national team. However, when the WBSC changed its international competition age groups from 16U to 15U in 2012, a 15U division was added to the National Team Championships for the new 15U national team, the 16U division was changed to 17U and the 17U and 14U divisions now funneled into the newly created NTDP.

Through this event, which is still held annually in both Arizona and Florida, USA Baseball provides an opportunity for 400+ teams to showcase their ability against teams from all across the country.

In Florida, the USA Baseball National Team Championships are held in Palm Beach County, Florida, at Roger Dean Stadium, the spring-training home of the St. Louis Cardinals and Miami Marlins, and The Ballpark of the Palm Beaches, the spring-training home of the 2017 World Series Champions Houston Astros and the Washington Nationals.

In Arizona, the USA Baseball National Team Championships are held in Glendale, Goodyear, Peoria, and Surprise, Arizona, at the spring-training homes of the Los Angeles Dodgers, Cleveland Indians, San Diego Padres, Texas Rangers, Cincinnati Reds, Kansas City Royals, and Chicago White Sox.

Futures Invitational
The USA Baseball 10U and 11U Futures Invitational are elite, invitation-only youth championship events, exclusively reserved for top 10U and 11U teams and athletes. The four-day, championship tournaments will both be hosted at the USA Baseball National Training Complex, the official training site of Team USA and adjoining Thomas Brooks Park and/or Middle Creek Park in Cary, North Carolina. Both the 10U and 11U event will host the best teams from across the country featuring the top youth talent in the nation.

National Team Identification Series (NTIS)
The USA Baseball National Team Identification Series (NTIS) is the most comprehensive player identification program offered by Team USA. Players from across the country will participate in selection events and tryouts on the regional level with the aim of ultimately being named to their regional team. Those regional teams will then compete in their respective age groups against the 15 other regions from across the country at the culminating National Team Identification Series Champions Cup event at the USA Baseball National Training Complex in Cary, North Carolina, in the fall of 2019.

The program includes six separate men's age groups – 11U, 13U, 14U, 15U, 16U and 17U. From the final 2018 NTIS event, USA Baseball will invite a minimum of 68 players to future National Team Trials, National Team Development Program (NTDP) and Tournament of Stars opportunities with the ultimate goal of being selected to represent our country as a part of Team USA in 2019.

All of the regional teams within each age group will be put together by our various NTIS Regional Directors. These various regional directors will be responsible for identifying and selecting 18-player teams which will participate in the culminating event in Cary, North Carolina.

12U NTIS
Held in various locations throughout the country, the 12U NTIS will offer athletes across the U.S. the opportunity to become involved with Team USA, while providing instruction, evaluation and fun. Players from the 12U NTIS will be recommended to USA Baseball officials and, from those recommendations, USA Baseball will invite 128 players to participate in the 12U National Open.

To find a tryout near you, please visit USABaseball.com.

Women's National Open
The USA Baseball Women's National Open brings together more than 100 of the top female baseball players in the country to compete against each other for the chance to earn a spot on the Women's National Team Trials roster. These players are split into six teams, competing in games and participating in positional workouts while being scouted and evaluated by the Women's National Team staff. Following the conclusion of the event, the 40-woman Women's National Team Trials roster is announced, followed by National Team Trials and Training, as well as the World Baseball Softball (WBSC) Women's Baseball World Cup.

USA Baseball Cups
The 2019 USA Baseball's 14U and 16U Cups are open-invitation tournaments composed of 32 teams. The 14U and 16U Cups will involve 16 teams each. Each team is guaranteed four games (weather permitting). The events are held in Cary, North Carolina, at the USA Baseball National Training Complex. USA Baseball will award 32 teams the right to participate based on an application approval process.

Sport Development 
The USA Baseball Sport Development team aims to grow the game of baseball through youth programs, player development, safety and educational initiatives. The Sport Development website – SportDev.org – houses all USA Baseball's development initiatives, educational resources, certifications and blog material. The website provides free online education courses and resources, development initiatives such as Hit and Run, Fun At Bat and the Prospect Development Pipeline, coach and umpire certification and the Sport Development Blog.

MLB/USA Baseball events 
As part of an ongoing partnership, USA Baseball and Major League Baseball have worked together to create a host of events that contribute to the growth and proliferation of the game of baseball, as well as the identification and growth of young athletes.

Breakthrough Series
The Breakthrough Series, established in 2008, is a joint effort on behalf of USA Baseball and Major League Baseball. This unique program focuses on developing the player on and off the field through seminars, mentorship, gameplay, scout evaluations, video coverage, and the highest level of instruction all while providing a platform for the players to perform for scouts and collegiate coaches. The events are completely cost free with USA Baseball covering expenses for the players.

Players in the MLB and USA Baseball diversity pipeline, including the Breakthrough Series, Dream Series and Elite Development Invitational may be offered additional development and instructional opportunities throughout the year. Affording participants touch points at different times during the season will allow for consistent growth opportunities both in competitive and non-competitive settings and will aide in the continued advancement of their life and baseball skills.

Elite Development Invitational
Utilizing the successful Breakthrough Series instructional model incorporating multiple seminars, Major League Baseball, USA Baseball and the Major League Baseball Players Association teamed up to develop the revolutionary Elite Development Invitational.

In 2017, the event welcomed 200 players (ages 12–17) and more than two dozen coaches with a combined 200-plus years of baseball experience to historic Dodgertown in Vero Beach, Florida, for two weeks of intensive instruction.

The wide-ranging group of coaches covered every field position and instructed players in a variety of workouts and game situations throughout the week.

Players in the MLB and USA Baseball diversity pipeline, including the Breakthrough Series and Elite Development Invitational may be offered additional development and instructional opportunities throughout the year. Affording participants touch points at different times during the season will allow for consistent growth opportunities both in competitive and non-competitive settings and will aide in the continued advancement of their life and baseball skills.

Over 30 former professional players including veterans like Jerry Manuel, Maury Wills, Tom Gordon, Lee Smith, Marquis Grissom, and Endy Chavez served as instructors with Commissioner Manfred, Joe Torre, Harold Reynolds, Dusty Baker and Dee Gordon stopping by to share their knowledge and experiences. Facilitating a Spring Training atmosphere for the aspiring professional players, days consisted of individual work, games, situational play, "chalk talk" and nightly seminars about the baseball industry.

Trailblazer Series
In 2017, USA Baseball and Major League Baseball launched a new baseball tournament for girls, held in the greater Los Angeles area, and built around Jackie Robinson Day Weekend. In 2018, approximately 100 girls, once again, had an unprecedented opportunity to participate in the Trailblazer Series.

Dream Series
The Dream Series, established in 2017, is operated by Major League Baseball and USA Baseball. This event will host a diverse group of more than 60 high school pitchers and catchers from across the country, in a special development camp atmosphere as well as a showcase for professional scouts and collegiate recruiters.

In addition to the on-field actions, participants will receive daily presentations from former Major Leaguers, scouts, college administrators, umpires and other industry professionals. The focus of these presentations will be to prepare the prospect for the collegiate and professional recruiting processes and offer information about alternative careers within the baseball industry. As in similar amateur development camps, a large contingent of college recruiters and professional scouts are expected to attend and evaluate players who demonstrate potential, but may not have had the opportunity for exposure through other events.

Coaches at this year's Dream Series include Bob Didier, Marvin Freeman, Marquis Grissom, LaTroy Hawkins, Kenny Hill, Charles Johnson, Jerry Manuel, Darren Oliver, Dave Stewart, and Lenny Webster.

Online educational resources
Education is one of the fundamental building blocks of the game. As such, USA Baseball's educational resources emphasize a culture of development, safety and fun within the sport through free online training courses and programs for players, parents, coaches and umpires. Content is available in both English and Spanish.

Mobile Coach
The USA Baseball Mobile Coach App, free to all users, features practice plans, unique drills, and video tutorials to assist coaches of all levels to run competent, safe, age and skill appropriate practices for their players.

Long-Term Athlete Development Plan (LTAD)
USA Baseball, with support from Major League Baseball (MLB), has generated a Long-Term Athlete Development Plan (LTAD) to provide a multi-stage developmental pathway for an individual's lifelong experience within the sport of baseball in the United States. Through developmentally appropriate programs for all ages, the LTAD aims to increase participation, aid in performance, and enhance enjoyment across the sport of baseball. The LTAD plan is a culmination of evidence-based information from the principal contributor group and input from a leadership group consisting of experts from the medical safety industry, MLB league and club executives, and an advisory group inclusive of leaders from across the amateur baseball spectrum.

High school baseball manual
The high school baseball program manual has been developed to support the thousands of dedicated high school coaches around the country in their quest to provide a positive, development-based experience to their student-athletes.

Prospect Development Pipeline (PDP)
The Prospect Development Pipeline (PDP) is a collaborative effort between Major League Baseball (MLB) and USA Baseball. The program established an official identification and player assessment pathway for elite high school age amateur baseball players in the United States to all 30 MLB Clubs for the amateur draft.

Play Ball
Play Ball is a collaborative initiative between Major League Baseball and USA Baseball that highlights the many ways baseball can be played, including ways outside of traditionally organized baseball leagues and tournaments. Events hosted around the country provide an opportunity for youth to experience the game in a variety of different forms in a non-competitive environment.

Pitch Smart
Pitch Smart is a joint initiative by Major League Baseball and USA Baseball that provides a series of practical, age-appropriate guidelines to help parents, players and coaches avoid overuse injuries and foster long, healthy careers for youth pitchers.

Fun At Bat
Fun At Bat is an entry-level bat and ball program for kids with an emphasis on character development, functional movement, active play, and fun. The initiative stems from meticulous research on introductory youth sport programs and is supported by Major League Baseball, USA Baseball and industry professionals.

Hit and Run Baseball
Hit and Run Baseball is a joint initiative between Major League Baseball and USA Baseball that provides guidelines for fun, new ways to engage youth baseball players in formal competitive play. The program serves youth leagues, tournament providers and amateur coaches by providing game modification recommendations focused on pace of play and additional skill building opportunities for athletes that are designed to occur more frequently than traditional gameplay exposure.

Coach and umpire certification
Utilizing USA Baseball's educational content and achieving a certification keeps coaches current with what is happening in the modern game of baseball. It's great for overall professional growth. Whether you coach a recreational youth team or one of our National Teams, we have education for you and a certification to go along with it. All great leaders in the game are also lifelong learners, always looking for new things to implement within their programs. We can never learn or achieve too much. We are pleased to offer to Coach and Umpire Certification pathways to help you on your journey in our national pastime.

Baseball ACE
Baseball ACE is an educational program for any and all individuals who are currently coaching baseball or aspire to coach at any level of the game. Offered in partnership by USA Baseball and the American Baseball Coaches Association (ABCA), this program aims to create a culture of continuing education, professional development and mentorship within the baseball coaching community.

USABat
USA Baseball, the national governing body for the sport of baseball in the U.S., in conjunction with participating national member organizations has adopted a new method for measuring bat performance in the testing of youth bats. Informed by the research of leading scientists on the USA Baseball Bat Study Committee, and supported by its National Member Organizations, — including the American Amateur Baseball Congress (AABC), Babe Ruth Baseball/Cal Ripken Baseball, Dixie Youth Baseball & Dixie Boys Baseball, Little League Baseball and PONY Baseball — USA Baseball has concluded that recent advancements in science, engineering, technology, and the materials available to fabricate non-wood bats, now allow the manufacturers to construct youth bats that can perform at a wood-like level through the entire range of lengths and weights of youth bats.

The new USA Baseball bat standard (USABat), which applies to bats that are classified below the NCAA and NFHS level of play, will be implemented on January 1, 2018, allowing the bat manufacturers sufficient time to bring these bats to the marketplace.

Similar to the NCAA and NFHS BBCOR standard, which helped to eliminate discrepancies with different length bats and thus provide a more direct measure of bat performance, the USA Baseball bat standard will allow youth baseball organizations in the United States to reach their goal of establishing a wood-like standard, a standard that will provide for the long-term integrity of the game.

Golden Spikes Award
Since 1978, USA Baseball has honored the top amateur baseball player in the nation with the Golden Spikes Award. The award is presented in partnership with the Rod Dedeaux Foundation and is given each year to the player who best exhibits exceptional on-field ability and exemplary sportsmanship.

In 2018, California’s Andrew Vaughn won the prestigious award in a presentation on ESPN's flagship program, SportsCenter. Following the nationally televised announcement of the winner, the finalists and their families were celebrated at the Jonathan Club Los Angeles as part of the 2018 Rod Dedeaux Foundation Awards Dinner.

In 2020, USA Baseball announced that it would forego naming a Golden Spikes Award winner given the canceled 2020 college baseball season due to the COVID-19 pandemic.

Past winners also include Terry Francona (1980), Will Clark (1985), Robin Ventura (1988), Jason Varitek (1994), J.D. Drew (1997), Mark Prior (2001), Jered Weaver (2004), Tim Lincecum (2006), David Price (2007), Buster Posey (2008), Stephen Strasburg (2009), Bryce Harper (2010), Trevor Bauer (2011), Mike Zunino (2012), Kris Bryant (2013), A.J. Reed (2014), Andrew Benintendi (2015), Kyle Lewis (2016) and Brendan McKay (2017).

Organizational awards 
Every year, USA Baseball recognizes the top National Team coach, developmental coach, volunteer coach, player, performance and team from the past season with its organizational awards. In addition, in years when USA Baseball fields a Women's National Team, the organization also recognizes the top female athlete of that year. The awards and past winners are as follows:

USA Baseball Rod Dedeaux Coach of the Year Award 
Presented annually in conjunction with the U.S. Olympic Committee and the Rod Dedeaux Foundation, the USA Baseball Rod Dedeaux Coach of the Year award is given to the National Team manager or coach who expects excellence out of his players. A coach who not only strives for his players to succeed but to become better human beings as well. The award was first presented in 1996.

USA Baseball Developmental Coach of the Year Award 
Presented annually in conjunction with the U.S. Olympic Committee, the USA Baseball Developmental Coach of the Year Award is given to the manager or coach who most prepares his players for the next level of baseball and as well as their future outside of the sport. The award was first presented in 1996.

USA Baseball Volunteer Coach of the Year Award 
Presented on a year-by-year basis in conjunction with the U.S. Olympic Committee, the USA Baseball Volunteer Coach of the Year Award is given to the coach who does not receive payment in any form for his or her involvement in assisting USA Baseball with coaching and growing the game of baseball at any level.

USA Baseball Player of the Year/Richard W. "Dick" Case Award 
From 1984 to 2002, the USA Baseball Player of Year Award was given to the athlete who was not only an outstanding player on the field, but also exemplified sportsmanship and love of the game as well. Beginning in 2003, the award was renamed the Richard W. “Dick” Case Award in honor of the organization's founding Executive Director/CEO.

USA Baseball International Performance of the Year Award 
The USA Baseball International Performance of the Year Award recognizes the athlete who authors the greatest single-game performance on an international stage while wearing the Team USA uniform in a given year. The annual award was first presented in 2009.

USA Baseball Sportswoman of the Year Award 
The USA Baseball Sportswoman of the Year Award is presented in years when the organization fields a Women's National Team to the top female athlete who was not only an outstanding player on the field, but also exemplified sportsmanship and love of the game.

USA Baseball Team of the Year Awards 
Finally, the USA Baseball Team of the Year is one whose success reaches far beyond the medal it wins. It is a team that teaches the game of baseball wherever it goes while embodying the ideals, standards and principles of USA Baseball and Team USA. The annual award was first presented in 1996.

Member organizations

Amateur Athletic Union (AAU)
American Amateur Baseball Congress (AABC)
American Baseball Coaches Association (ABCA)
American Legion Baseball
Babe Ruth Baseball
Baseball Players Association (BPA)
Dixie Baseball
Little League Baseball
National Amateur Baseball Federation
National Association of Intercollegiate Athletics (NAIA)
National Assoc. of Police Athletic Leagues
National Baseball Congress (NBC)
National Club Baseball Association (NCBA)
National Collegiate Athletic Association (NCAA)
National Federation of State High School Associations (NFHS)
National High School Baseball Coaches Assoc.
National Junior College Athletic Association (NJCAA)
PONY Baseball
T-BALL USA
United States Specialty Sports Association (USSSA)
World Baseball Classic (WBC)
YMCAs of the USA

See also
American Women's Baseball Federation
Amateur baseball in the United States
Baseball awards#U.S. amateur baseball
Baseball awards#U.S. college baseball
Baseball awards#U.S. high-school baseball
Baseball awards#U.S. youth baseball
USOC Athlete of the Year (2000 Team of the Year: USA Baseball Olympic team)

Footnotes

External links
USA Baseball official website
World Baseball Classic

 
1978 establishments in North Carolina
1978 in sports in North Carolina
Baseball governing bodies in the United States
Organizations based in Durham, North Carolina
Sports in Durham, North Carolina
Sports organizations established in 1978